is a Japanese freestyle swimmer.

Major achievements
 1998 Asian Games - 50m freestyle 2nd (23.26)
 2001 World Championships - 50m freestyle 3rd (22.18)

Personal bests
In long course:
 50m freestyle: 22.18 Asian, Japanese Record (July 28, 2001)

See also
 Eri Yamanoi

References

1977 births
Living people
Japanese male freestyle swimmers
Sportspeople from Ibaraki Prefecture
World Aquatics Championships medalists in swimming
Asian Games medalists in swimming
Universiade medalists in swimming
Asian Games gold medalists for Japan
Asian Games silver medalists for Japan
Swimmers at the 1998 Asian Games
Medalists at the 1998 Asian Games
Universiade bronze medalists for Japan
Medalists at the 2001 Summer Universiade